Beauty School Cop Outs is a British reality television series based in Manchester, England and broadcast on MTV. The show premiered on 29 October 2013 and follows British and Irish youngsters as they move to a beauty school in Manchester to learn the tricks of the trade.

History
The series was confirmed on 20 August 2013, and began airing on 29 October 2013 on MTV.

Cast
The official cast members were announced on 24 September 2013. The cast features four boys; Calvin, Daniel, Jeremy and Richard, as well as four girls; Sacha, Savannah, Scarlett and Tara. Scarlett Moffatt later appeared on Channel 4's show Gogglebox alongside her parents, whilst Jeremy McConnell took part in the seventeenth series of Celebrity Big Brother.

Duration of cast

Notes 
Key:    = Cast member is featured in this episode.
Key:    = Cast member arrives in the house.
Key:    = Cast member voluntarily leaves the house.
Key:    = Cast member is removed from the house.
Key:    = Cast member returns to the house.

Other appearances
As well as appearing in Beauty School Cop Outs, some of the cast members have competed in other reality TV shows including Celebrity Big Brother and I'm a Celebrity...Get Me Out of Here!.

Celebrity Big Brother
Jeremy McConnell – Series 17 (2016) – Eighth
I'm a Celebrity...Get Me Out of Here!
Scarlett Moffatt – Series 16 (2016) – Winner

Series

References

2013 British television series debuts
2013 British television series endings
2010s British reality television series
English-language television shows
MTV original programming
Television shows set in Manchester